In finance, assets under management (AUM), sometimes called fund under management, measures the total market value of all the financial assets which an individual or financial institution—such as a mutual fund, venture capital firm, or depository institution—or a decentralized network protocol controls, typically on behalf of a client. Funds may be managed for clients, platform users, or solely for themselves, such as in the case of a financial institution which has mutual funds or holds its own venture capital. The definition and formula for calculating AUM may differ from one entity to another.

Overview
Assets under management is a popular metric used within the traditional investment industry, as well as for decentralized finance, such as cryptocurrency, to measure the size and success of an investment management entity. AUM represents the market value of all of the securities that a financial entity owns and manages, or simply manages.

The AUM of an entity is often compared with historical data to express the amount (or lack) of growth. It is also often compared with the AUM of competitors with an increase in AUM evidence of positive performance (growth). However, investment strategies may be capacity constrained. This means that the strategy's investment performance is adversely affected if it manages too much capital. Namely, its performance is adversely affected if its AUM exceeds the strategy's capacity. As a result, these funds may be closed to new investors and oversubscribed. For such funds, AUM may not be an accurate metric of success. For example, the SPDR S&P 500 index fund manages nearly 400 billion in assets. It is not capacity constrained and it is still open to new investors. In contrast, Renaissance Technologies' Medallion Fund has significantly outperformed the S&P 500 index since its inception. However, it manages fewer assets (reportedly about 34.8 billion) than the SPDR S&P 500 index fund because it is oversubscribed and closed to new investors.

Methods of calculating AUM can vary between firms or decentralized protocols. Investment management companies generally charge their clients fees as a proportion of AUM, so assets under management, combined with the firm's average fee rate, are the key factors indicating an investment management company's top line revenue. The fee structure may depend on contracted arrangements between each client and the firm or fund. Decentralized protocols also use a variety of ways to incent growth of AUM, typically in the form of offering a return to those who serve the role of providing liquidity on the protocol.

Assets under management rise and fall. They may increase when investment performance is positive, or when new customers and new assets are brought into the firm. Rising AUM normally increases the fees which the firm generates. Conversely, AUM are reduced by negative investment performance, as well as redemptions or withdrawals, including fund closures, client defections and other generally adverse events. Lower AUM tend to result in lower fees generated.

Content
The precise definition of AUM varies by institution, as some firms may include certain assets as being "under management", while others may not. Some include bank deposits, mutual funds, and cash in their computation, while others only consider the discretionary funds that investors have given an advisor to trade on their behalf.

While different firms may include assets that others do not in their AUM computation, Assets Under Management typically include:
 Capital raised from investors;
 Capital belonging to the principals of the fund management firm.

Net asset value vs assets under management 
Net asset value (NAV) is the total value of assets minus all its liabilities of a fund, such as a mutual fund or ETF, often shown on a per-share basis. NAV shows what price shares in a fund can be bought and sold at.

AUM by contrast refers to the value of assets managed by an individual or firm, not a fund. Unlike NAV, AUM is in reference to the total value of assets being managed rather than expressed on a per-share basis.

Assets under advisement 
A related concept in the investment industry to assets under management is assets under advisement (AUA). This measures the total market value of all the financial assets that are advised by a financial institution, which is typically an investment consultant or intermediary. The advisory firm generally does not have discretion to manage the assets, but rather provides advice as to how those assets may be managed. For example, consider an investment consultant that is hired by a  pension fund to advise the fund on portfolio construction, asset allocation, fund manager selection, etc. The consultant does not have discretion to manage the assets and thus would not include the assets in their firm's AUM. Global investment consultants with the largest AUA include Mercer ( in AUA), Aon ( in AUA), Russell Investments ( in AUA), and Cambridge Associates ( in AUA).

Assets under custody and/or administration 
Another related concept in the investment industry to assets under management is assets under custody and/or administration. This measures the total market value of all the financial assets that held by a financial institution acting as a custodian or fund administrator, which is typically an intermediary. The intermediary generally does not have discretion to manage the assets, but rather provides a service whereby they act as an independent third-party between fund managers and investors to verify and distribute assets tied to investments. The largest custodians and fund administrators include BNY Mellon ($41.7 trillion in assets under custody), State Street ($38.8 trillion in assets under custody), and JPMorgan Chase ($28.6 trillion in assets under custody).

See also 

 List of asset management firms

References

External links
Fund Management Activities Survey 2005
Sovereign Wealth Fund Assets Under Management

Investment management